The 1966 FIBA European Champions Cup Final Four was the concluding tournament of the 1965–66 FIBA European Champions Cup, and the first FIBA European Champions Cup Final Four tournament of all time.

Simmenthal Milano won its first FIBA European Champions Cup (EuroLeague) title.

Bracket

Final standings

Awards

FIBA European Champions Cup Finals Top Scorer
 Jiří Zídek Sr. ( Slavia VŠ Praha)

External links
1965–66 FIBA European Champions Cup 
1965–66 FIBA European Champions Cup
Champions Cup 1965–66 Line-ups and Stats

1965–66 in European basketball
1965–66
1966 in Italian sport
1966 in Czechoslovak sport
1966 in Greek sport
1966 in Soviet sport
International basketball competitions hosted by Italy
20th century in Bologna